Maria Kirilenko and Nadia Petrova defeated Andrea Hlaváčková and Lucie Hradecká in the final, 6–1, 6–4 to win the doubles tennis title at the 2012 WTA Tour Championships.

Liezel Huber and Lisa Raymond were the defending champions, but were defeated by Hlaváčková and Hradecká in the semifinals.

Seeds

Draw

Finals

References
General

Specific

Doubles
WTA Tour Championships